Khalil Fayad (born 9 June 2004) is a French professional footballer who plays as a midfielder for Ligue 1 club Montpellier.

Club career 
Born in Montpellier, Fayad played all his youth football for local side Montpellier HSC, which he had joined in 2010. He made his professional debut for the club on the 13 August 2022, replacing Joris Chotard during a 5–2 Ligue 1 loss away to Paris Saint-Germain. Fayad delivered the assist for Montpellier's second goal, scored by Enzo Tchato.

International career
Born in France, Fayad is of Moroccan descent. He is a youth international for France, having played for the France U18s.

References

External links

2004 births
Living people
Sportspeople from Montpellier
French footballers
France youth international footballers
French sportspeople of Moroccan descent
Association football midfielders
Montpellier HSC players
Championnat National 2 players
Ligue 1 players